New Times LA is a now-defunct alternative weekly newspaper that was published in Los Angeles, California by New Times Media from 1996 to 2002.

History
It was formed by the purchase and merger of the Los Angeles View/Los Angeles Village View and the Los Angeles Reader, and fired the staff members of both papers. The editor-in-chief for its entire run was Rick Barrs. Writer Jill Stewart was the paper's controversial political columnist.

Los Angeles Magazine stated that the New Times Los Angeles "blasted" the LA Weekly "as often as it remembered to—calling its staff dunderheads, beret wearers, throwbacks, and ass kissers. That's the nice stuff." Howard Blume of the LA Weekly stated that the New Times LA was "a quirky and inconsistent, yet valuable, journalistic voice". Los Angeles Magazine stated that the New Times Los Angeles "never got a foothold".

In 2002, New Times Media entered into a non-competition agreement with Village Voice Media, another national publisher of alternative weeklies, whereby the two companies agreed to stop publishing New Times LA (a product of New Times Media) and Cleveland Free Times (a product of Village Voice Media), so that the companies would not publish two competing newspapers in any single city. The competing paper in Los Angeles was the LA Weekly. New Times Media continues to publish other New Times-titled publications, including Miami New Times, New Times Broward-Palm Beach, and Phoenix New Times.

This agreement and phasing out of the two newspapers led to an antitrust investigation by the U.S. Department of Justice.  The investigation resulted in a settlement, requiring the companies to sell off assets and the old newspapers' titles to any potential competitors.

The assets included such things as "office furniture, telephone systems", "all rights to the print and electronic archives of New Times LA publications", "permits and licenses for individual distribution racks and boxes", and "all customer lists, contracts, accounts, and credit records".

At the time of closing, 100 employees worked for the newspaper.

New Times LA'''s assets were bought by Southland Publishing, Inc., who publish various local newsweeklies. Among the assets included news racks, which allowed Southland to start two new papers: Los Angeles CityBeat and ValleyBeat.

References

External links
 Blackwell, Savannah (Jan 29, 2003) "New Times Nailed: SF Weekly's Parent Company Charged with Violating Antitrust Law", San Francisco Bay Guardian'' (Archive)

Alternative weekly newspapers published in the United States
Newspapers published in Greater Los Angeles
Defunct weekly newspapers
Publications disestablished in 2002
Newspapers established in 1996
Defunct newspapers published in California
1996 establishments in California
2002 disestablishments in California
Weekly newspapers published in California